Ohel ("tent" or "house") is the name of the fourth son of Zerubbabel.

External links
Chabad.org: Divrei Hayamim I - I Chronicles - Chapter 3

6th-century BCE Jews